Pish Qaleh (also Romanized as Pīsh Qal‘eh; also known as Qal‘eh) is a city in Maneh District, Maneh and Samalqan County, North Khorasan Province, Iran. At the 2006 census, its population was 1,631, in 465 families.

References 

Populated places in Maneh and Samalqan County

Cities in North Khorasan Province